Kabuliwala is a Bengali short story written by Rabindranath Tagore in 1892, during Tagore's "Sadhana" period (named for one of Tagore's magazines) from 1891 to 1895. The story is about a fruit seller, a Pashtun from Kabul, Afghanistan, who visits Calcutta (present day Kolkata), India each year to sell dry fruits. While living in India, he develops a filial affection for a five-year-old girl, Mini, from a middle-class aristocratic family, who reminds him of his own beloved daughter back home in Afghanistan.

Theme and plot
The main theme of this story is that humans, no matter what their nationality or background, are all the same, as symbolised by filial affection—the deep love that fathers have for their children.
In the story there are three examples of filial affection—the narrator and his daughter Mini; the Kabuliwala "Rahmat" and his own daughter in Afghanistan; and the Rahmat "Kabuliwala" and Mini. In this story Rahmat comes to India every year to sell dry-fruits and to meet this girl named Mini. He had a physical altercation with a person while collecting debts and was imprisoned. After several years, he was pardoned and was released from jail.  He returned to meet Mini at her house on her wedding day, but she had grown up and did not recognize him. Her father, however, gave him some money so he could visit his own daughter.

Adaptations
The story has adapted a number of times as listed below:
 Kabuliwala, a 1957 Bengali movie
 Kabuliwala, a 1961 Hindi movie
 Kabuliwala, a 2006 Bengali movie
 Kabuliwala – as a part of television series Stories by Rabindranath Tagore Bioscopewala, a 2018 Hindi movie

See also
 List of works by Rabindranath Tagore

References

External links
 Onward English Reader'' – 7 (new Edition), by Strevens P, 
 Short Stories from Rabindranath Tagore, by Rabindranath Tagore, translation Pratima Bowes, 1999, East-West Publications (U.K.) Limited, 
 Downloadable Kabuliwala in English
 The 'Kabuliwala' Afghans of Kolkata, published by BBC

Works by Rabindranath Tagore
Indian short stories
Short stories adapted into films